The 2015 Blancpain Sprint Series Zandvoort round was the last of seven rounds of the 2015 Blancpain Sprint Series season. It took place at Circuit Park Zandvoort in The Netherlands between 9 October and 11 October 2015.

Report

Background

Championship contender Laurens Vanthoor injured
Before the season finale, Robin Frijns and Laurens Vanthoor led the championship by eight points, but Vanthoor was not able to try and win the championship together with Frijns as he was injured in a heavy crash in the Qualifying Race at Misano the week before. On the straight before Turn 8 (Quercia) he made contact with the HTP Bentley of Jules Szymkowiak sending the both into the barriers. Both drivers could get out of their cars, but Vanthoor had to be transported to the medical centre to get treatment for a sprained foot. In Zandvoort he was replaced by Christopher Mies.

Jeroen Bleekemolen returns
Jeroen Bleekemolen returned to the series after an almost one-year absence. He replaced Marco Seefried, because Seefried was not able to race in Zandvoort as he is also a driver for Dempsey Racing-Proton in the FIA WEC and the round at Zandvoort clashed with the 6 Hours of Fuji.

Free practice
Maximilian Buhk was the quickest driver in the first of two free practice sessions. His fastest lap was a 1:38.084, which was eight tenths faster than championship rival Frijns.

FP2 was dominated by Audi with six cars in the top seven. Debutant Nicki Thiim managed to get the fastest time with a 1:38.205. Frijns was again second, three tenths behind his Danish teammate.

Qualifying
The No. 84 HTP Bentley of Abril and Buhk was back on top after qualifying and managed to get Pole position for the Qualifying Race. Their championships rivals Frijns, who qualified second, and Norbert Siedler, who qualified fourth, were close behind as the top four was covered by only three tenths of a second. In the second qualifying session Max van Splunteren went off track, which damaged their Bentley. Although he and teammate Szymkowiak were faster than some others, they were still put to the back of the grid, because they were penalized after the crash at Misano involving Szymkowiak and Vanthoor.

Qualifying Race

Warm-Up
The championship contending No. 333 Rinaldi Ferrari of Siedler (and Bleekemolen) withdrew from the Main Race after they had suffered an engine failure in the warm-up session. The engine just suddenly lost power causing Siedler to give up his championship hopes.

Main Race

Classification

Qualifying

Notes

Qualifying Race
Class winners in bold.

Notes

Main Race
Class winners in bold.

Notes

Standings after the race

Drivers' Championship standings

 Note: Only the top five positions are included.

References

External links

Motorsport competitions in the Netherlands
2015 in Dutch sport